A tranchet axe is a lithic tool made by removing a flake, known, when using this method, as a tranchet flake, parallel to the final intended cutting edge of the tool which creates a single straight edge as wide as the tool itself. It is found in some Acheulean assemblages as well as in Mesolithic flaked stone industries.

Lithics